The National Council of the Union of Burma was an opposition organisation in Myanmar (Burma), composed of representatives of armed groups and exiled political organisations. The organisation was formed on 22 September 1992 and aimed to achieve a democratic federal system in Burma.

References 

Defunct political party alliances in Myanmar
Liberal parties in Myanmar
Burmese democracy movements
Members of the Unrepresented Nations and Peoples Organization
Organizations established in 1992
1992 establishments in Myanmar